The Southern Division by-election 1858 was a by-election held in the multi-member  electorate during the 2nd New Zealand Parliament, on 8 May 1858.

The by-election was caused by the resignation of incumbent MP Charles Taylor and was won by Theodore Haultain. On nomination day (28 April) Haultain and David Graham were nominated; Graham was the brother of the other member representing the electorate, Robert Graham. After a show of hands in favour of Haultain, Graham demanded a poll. Theodore Haultain was subsequently elected on 8 May.

Results

References

Southern Division 1858
1858 elections in New Zealand
May 1858 events
Politics of the Auckland Region
1850s in Auckland